is a type of Japanese pottery traditionally made in Takamatsu, Kagawa prefecture.

References

External links 
 http://educators.mfa.org/asia-africa/incense-burner-takamatsu-rihei-ware-79298

Culture in Kagawa Prefecture
Japanese pottery
Takamatsu, Kagawa